The 2015 New York Yankees season was the 113th for the New York Yankees, who play in the American League East of Major League Baseball. They finished the regular season with a record of 87–75, six games behind the Toronto Blue Jays and second in the AL East.  They clinched the host Wild Card berth, but lost to the Houston Astros in the 2015 American League Wild Card Game.

This was the Yankees' first full season in over twenty years without team captain and shortstop Derek Jeter, who retired at the end of the 2014 season. In addition, the Yankees retired the jersey numbers of center fielder Bernie Williams (51), catcher Jorge Posada (20), and pitcher Andy Pettitte (46) during the season; doing so brought the total amount of retired numbers to 20, for 22 different players.

In 2022, a letter was released detailing the illicit use of technology to steal signs by the Yankees during the 2015 and 2016 seasons.

Offseason

The Yankees fired Kevin Long, the hitting coach, and Mick Kelleher, the first base coach on October 10. They also re-signed GM Brian Cashman to a three-year deal that same day.

On November 8, the Yankees re-signed free agent outfielder Chris Young to a 1-year, $2.5 million contract with incentives. On November 12, the Yankees signed left-hander José de Paula to a 1-year major league contract worth $500,000. That same day, the Yankees traded longtime backup catcher Francisco Cervelli to the Pittsburgh Pirates in exchange for left-hander Justin Wilson.

On December 3, the Yankees signed reliever Esmil Rogers to a 1-year, $1.48 million contract. On December 5, the Yankees acquired shortstop Didi Gregorius from the Arizona Diamondbacks in a three-team trade involving the Detroit Tigers.  The Yankees sent Shane Greene to the Tigers as part of the trade. That same day, the Yankees signed reliever Andrew Miller to a 4-year, $36 million deal. On December 15, the Yankees re-signed free agent third baseman Chase Headley, to a 4-year deal worth $52 million. On December 16, the Yankees re-signed left-hander Chris Capuano to a 1-year, $5 million deal. On December 19, the Yankees traded utility infielder Martín Prado to the Miami Marlins, along with pitcher David Phelps, in exchange for pitcher Nathan Eovaldi, 1B/OF Garrett Jones, and pitching prospect Domingo German. Also on December 19, the Yankees acquired relief pitcher Gonzalez Germen from the New York Mets, in exchange for cash considerations. He was later traded to the Texas Rangers on January 20, again in exchange for cash considerations. On December 29, the Yankees traded reliever Shawn Kelley to the San Diego Padres, in exchange for minor league pitcher Johnny Barbato.

On January 1, the Yankees traded pitching prospect Manny Banuelos to the Atlanta Braves, in exchange for relievers David Carpenter, and Chasen Shreve. On January 6, the Yankees signed infielder Stephen Drew to a 1-year contract, worth $5 million with incentives. On January 11, the Yankees hired Jeff Pentland to be their main hitting coach, along with Alan Cockrell to be the assistant hitting coach. In addition, the Yankees also hired Joe Espada to be their third base coach. On January 13, the Yankees acquired reliever Chris Martin from the Colorado Rockies in exchange for cash considerations.

On February 16, the Yankees signed pitcher Jared Burton to a minor league contract and invited him to spring training. In February, the Yankees announced they will retire Bernie Williams number 51 on May 24, Jorge Posada's number 20 on August 22, and Andy Pettitte's number 46 on August 23.

On March 11, Yankees pitcher Chris Capuano left a spring training game with a strained right quad. On March 26, the Yankees released pitcher Jared Burton, before resigning him three days later. On April 1, the Yankees acquired Gregorio Petit from the Houston Astros for cash or a player to be named later.

Notable transaction chart

Season standings

American League East

American League Wild Card

Season summary

April 

The Yankees lost their Opening Day game on April 6 against Toronto, losing 6-1. The Yankees only accumulated three total hits that first game, with a home run by Brett Gardner accounting for the only run scored by the Yankees. They bounced back to win the next game 4–3 on April 8, which was the first Yankees win of the season. On April 28, ace pitcher Masahiro Tanaka was placed on the 15-day disabled list with a tendinitis in his right wrist and a slight strain on his forearm. It was not connected to the elbow injury he suffered in the previous season. The Yankees would later finish the first month with a 13–9 record atop the American League East division.

The success of the New York Yankees in April was a result of good hitting against opposing team's bullpens and good offense to keep games close. In fact, seven of the thirteen wins in April were decided by one or two runs. Mixing and matching both pitching and offense was also key in the part of manager Joe Girardi. Some notable contributions came from players such as Alex Rodriguez, Jacoby Ellsbury, Mark Teixeira, Chris Young, Brett Gardner, Dellin Betances, and even from the Yankees closer Andrew Miller.  Miller, who had joined the Yankees during the off-season, had been impressive with eight saves in eight chances in the month of April.

In April, Brett Gardner had also started the trend of having the team grow mustaches and it caught on.

May

The Yankees beat the Boston Red Sox 4–2 on May 2, during which Andrew Miller had set Yankees club history by securing nine saves in the first 23 games the Yankees had played in a season. Mariano Rivera, the former Yankees closer who had retired following the 2013 season, had not even performed this feat during his 19-year career. It was the same game that Alex Rodriguez hit a pinch-hit home run off of Red Sox pitcher Junichi Tazawa, his first as a pinch-hitter, and tied Willie Mays for fourth on the all-time home run list at 660 homers. Rodriguez was emotional following the game. The Yankees not long after had announced they would not be paying Rodriguez the $6 million in bonuses that he was promised when he had signed a contract years before for reaching these marks.

On May 19, Jacoby Ellsbury was placed on the 15-day disabled list with a sprained right knee. This was his first DL stint in his career with the Yankees. May did not turn out well for the Yankees as they finished the month winning 13 ball games but losing 16.

June
June saw a turn in play for the Yankees, as they won seven straight to begin the month of June. In the month, various achievements were reached. Alex Rodriguez hit his 3000th career hit at home on June 19, hitting a home run to right field off from Detroit Tigers pitcher Justin Verlander. The achievement was similar to Derek Jeter's 3000th hit in 2011, when he homered to left off from Tampa Bay Rays pitcher David Price. Price and Verlander happen to both be winners of the Cy Young Award. Ironically, Price and Verlander were both members of the Tigers organization the date of Rodriguez's 3000th hit. A few weeks later, Rodriguez was given the ball back from Zack Hample, the fan who caught it.

In the same month, the disabled list saw a bit of action. Notable to mention, Jacoby Ellsbury's injury took longer than expected to heal up. His rehab assignment began on June 29. In a home series against the Philadelphia Phillies, pitcher Iván Nova had returned to the hill for the first time since being injured in the prior season, winning for the Yankees and preventing a sweep. Another notable injury-related movement was the placement of closing pitcher Andrew Miller onto the disabled list early in June with a strained forearm muscle.

The Yankees finished the month of June winning 15 games and losing 12.

July 

When the roster for the American League all-star team was announced, Dellin Betances and Mark Teixeira were revealed to be on the roster, with Teixeira replacing an injured Miguel Cabrera of the Tigers. In addition, the final vote held Brett Gardner as a candidate. Gardner later was announced as the replacement on the roster for an injured Alex Gordon of the Royals. None of them were starters. On July 28 against the Texas Rangers, the Yankees score 21 unanswered runs – 11 of them in the 2nd inning – after giving up 5 runs in the first inning en route to a 21-5 win.

On July 30, the Seattle Mariners traded Dustin Ackley to the Yankees for José Ramírez and Ramón Flores. The next day, Garrett Jones was designated for assignment. (Jones was later re-signed in early August and then re-designated for assignment not long after)

The Yankees finished July with 17 wins and 7 losses.

August 
The beginning of August saw the Yankees begin to struggle. With the Toronto Blue Jays in a hot streak since the end of July (where they revamped their team with a few big name players), a once respectable lead in the division had shrunk down to just a half game ahead of the Jays by the end of August 11.  That night, the Yankees had traveled to Cleveland to face the Indians.  Entering that game, the Yankees had gone 31 straight innings without scoring a run. Despite having a 4–2 lead in the 10th inning, closer Andrew Miller blew the save. The game was decided in the 16th inning, where Michael Brantley had walked off for the Indians.  The Yankees lost 5-4. They lost the next day and the Blue Jays took lead of the division by half a game.

On August 5, Luis Severino had his major league debut starting against the Red Sox.

On August 13 the New York Yankees called up Greg Bird who went 0 for 5 in his debut. He got his first career hit on August 15 and his first and second career home runs on August 19.

The Yankees retook the division the lead on August 14 in one of the most intense games of the season. Down 3–1 in the top of the eighth, Yankees outfielder Carlos Beltrán hit a pinch-hit three-run home run to put the Yankees up 4–3; closer Andrew Miller finished the game for the Yankees in a nail-biting fashion, striking out Troy Tulowitzki on a slider after a 12-pitch at bat.  This also stopped the Blue Jays' 11 game win streak. By the end of August 23, the lead was lost to the Jays once again after the Yankees lost three out of four games at home against the Cleveland Indians. This series also saw CC Sabathia suffer a knee injury that was declared as possibly season-ending with Sabathia on the DL. After walking off against the Houston Astros in the first game at home during a series starting on August 24, the Yankees became tied with the Jays in 1st place in the AL East after Toronto took an off-day.  On August 25, the Yankees lost 15-1 to the Astros and lost first place once again to the Blue Jays, who became the first American League East team to win 70 wins. On August 28, the Yankees routed the Atlanta Braves at Turner Field 15–4 and gained their 70th win of the season.

They finished the month with 14 wins and 14 losses.

September 
Mark Teixeira, who bruised his bone on his shin in August, was announced to be out for the rest of season after an MRI scan showed he had in fact fractured it. Nathan Eovaldi's regular season ended after suffering an elbow injury.

The Yankees finished September with a record of 14–14.

October 
On October 1, the Yankees clinched a playoff spot for the first time since 2012 with a 4–1 win over the Boston Red Sox. This was also their 10,000th franchise victory. The Yankees finished October with 1 win and 3 losses.  Their final season record was 87–75, which was good enough to win the first American League Wild Card spot, earning the right to host the Houston Astros at Yankee Stadium on Tuesday, October 6.

However, a day prior, CC Sabathia left the team as he checked himself into an alcohol rehabilitation center. It was later announced by the Yankees that Sabathia would not be with the team during the postseason.

Wild Card loss
The Yankees were shut out 3–0 in the 2015 American League Wild Card Game by the Houston Astros, in a contest that turned on two solo home runs against the game's losing pitcher Masahiro Tanaka, hit by Houston's Carlos Gómez and Colby Rasmus. The winning pitcher was Dallas Keuchel who tossed six scoreless innings.

Record vs. opponents

Roster

Game log

|- align="center" bgcolor="ffbbbb"
| 1 || April 6 || Blue Jays || 1–6 || Hutchison (1–0)  || Tanaka (0–1) || – || 48,469 || 0–1
|- align="center" bgcolor="bbffbb"
| 2 || April 8 || Blue Jays || 4–3 || Betances (1–0) || Loup (0–1) || Miller (1) || 31,020 || 1–1
|- align="center" bgcolor="ffbbbb"
| 3 || April 9 || Blue Jays || 3–6 || Norris (1–0) || Sabathia (0–1) || Castro (1) || 32,152 || 1–2
|- align="center" bgcolor="ffbbbb"
| 4 || April 10 || Red Sox || 5–6 (19) || Wright (1–0) || Rogers (0–1) || – || 41,292 || 1–3
|- align="center" bgcolor="ffbbbb"
| 5 || April 11 || Red Sox || 4–8 || Kelly (1–0) || Warren (0–1) || – || 46,678 ||1–4
|- align="center" bgcolor="bbffbb"
| 6 || April 12 || Red Sox || 14–4 || Tanaka (1–1) || Buchholz (1–1) || – || 43,019 || 2–4
|- align="center" bgcolor="bbffbb"
| 7 || April 13 || @ Orioles || 6–5 || Pineda (1–0) || Hunter (0–1) || Miller (2) || 21,633 || 3–4
|- align="center" bgcolor="ffbbbb"
| 8 || April 14 || @ Orioles || 3–4 || González (1–1) || Sabathia (0–2) || Britton (2) || 19,283 || 3–5
|- align="center" bgcolor="ffbbbb"
| 9 || April 15 || @ Orioles || 5–7 || Brach (1–0) || Carpenter (0–1) || Britton (3) || 23,409 ||3–6
|- align="center" bgcolor="bbffbb"
| 10 || April 17 || @ Rays || 5–4 || Betances (2–0) || Jepsen (0–1)  || Miller (3) || 15,752 || 4–6
|- align="center" bgcolor="bbffbb"
| 11 || April 18 || @ Rays || 9–0 || Tanaka (2–1) || Odorizzi (2–1) || – || 20,824 || 5–6
|- align="center" bgcolor="bbffbb"
| 12 || April 19 || @ Rays || 5–3 || Pineda (2–0) || Andriese (0–1) || Miller (4) || 21,791 || 6–6
|- align="center" bgcolor="ffbbbb"
| 13 || April 20 || @ Tigers || 1–2 || Simón (3–0) || Sabathia (0–3) || Soria (5) || 27,540 || 6–7
|- align="center" bgcolor="bbffbb"
| 14 || April 21 || @ Tigers || 5–2 || Eovaldi (1–0) || Lobstein (1–1) || Miller (5) || 27,031 || 7–7
|- align="center" bgcolor="bbffbb"
| 15 || April 22 || @ Tigers || 13–4 || Warren (1–1) || Price (1–1) || – || 27,389 || 8–7
|- align="center" bgcolor="bbffbb"
| 16 || April 23 || @ Tigers || 2–1 || Betances (3–0) || Gorzelanny (0–1) || Miller (6) || 27,754 || 9–7
|- align="center" bgcolor="bbffbb"
| 17 || April 24 || Mets || 6–1  ||Pineda (3–0)|| deGrom (2–2) || – || 45,310 || 10–7 
|- align="center" bgcolor="ffbbbb"
| 18 || April 25 || Mets || 2–8 || Harvey (4–0) || Sabathia (0–4) || – || 47,909 || 10–8
|- align="center" bgcolor="bbffbb"
| 19 || April 26 || Mets || 6–4 || Shreve (1–0) || Niese (2–1) || Miller (7) || 47,510 || 11–8
|- align="center" bgcolor="bbffbb"
| 20 || April 27 || Rays || 4–1  || Wilson (1–0) || Gomes (0–1) || Miller (8) || 34,590 || 12–8
|- align="center" bgcolor="bbffbb"
| 21 || April 28 || Rays || 4–2 || Whitley (1–0) || Odorizzi (2–2)  || Martin (1) || 36,934 || 13–8
|- align="center" bgcolor="ffbbbb"
| 22 || April 29 || Rays || 2–3 (13) || Gomes (1–1) || Shreve (1–1) || Frieri (2) || 30,055 || 13–9
|-

|- align="center" bgcolor="bbffbb"
| 23 || May 1 || @ Red Sox || 3–2 || Rogers (1–1)  || Tazawa (0–1)  || Miller (9) || 35,444 || 14–9
|- align="center" bgcolor="bbffbb"
| 24 || May 2 || @ Red Sox || 4–2 || Eovaldi (2–0) || Miley (1–3) || Betances (1) || 36,611 || 15–9
|- align="center" bgcolor="bbffbb"
| 25 || May 3 || @ Red Sox || 8–5 || Warren (2–1) || Kelly (1–1) ||Miller (10) || 33,198 || 16–9
|- align="center" bgcolor="ffbbbb"
| 26 || May 4 || @ Blue Jays || 1–3 || Dickey (1–3) || Martin (0–1) || Cecil (2) || 19,217 || 16–10
|- align="center" bgcolor="bbffbb"
| 27 || May 5 || @ Blue Jays || 6–3 || Pineda (4–0) || Estrada (1–1) || Miller (11) || 21,519 || 17–10
|- align="center" bgcolor="ffbbbb"
| 28 || May 6 || @ Blue Jays || 1–5 || Buehrle (4–2) || Sabathia (0–5)  || – || 21,312 || 17–11
|- align="center" bgcolor="bbffbb"
| 29 || May 7 || Orioles || 4–3 || Eovaldi (3–0) || Tillman (2–4) || Miller (12) || 39,816 || 18–11
|- align="center" bgcolor="bbffbb"
| 30 || May 8 || Orioles || 5–4 || Betances (4–0) || González (2–4)  || Miller (13)|| 38,731 || 19–11
|- align="center" bgcolor="ffbbbb"
| 31 || May 9 || Orioles || 2–6 || Chen (1–1) || Whitley (1–1) || Britton (6) || 41,280 || 19–12
|- align="center" bgcolor="bbffbb"
| 32 || May 10 || Orioles || 6–2 || Pineda (5–0) || Norris (1–4) || – || 39,059 || 20–12
|- align="center" bgcolor="bbffbb"
| 33 || May 11 || @ Rays || 11–5 || Sabathia (1–5) || Colomé (2–1) || – || 10,619 || 21–12
|- align="center" bgcolor="ffbbbb"
| 34 || May 12 || @ Rays || 2–4 || Jepsen (1–2) || Eovaldi (3–1) || Boxberger (9) || 10,417 || 21–13
|- align="center" bgcolor="ffbbbb"
| 35 || May 13 || @ Rays || 2–3 || Karns (3–1) || Warren (2–2) || Boxberger (10) || 11,924 || 21–14
|- align="center" bgcolor="ffbbbb"
| 36 || May 14 || @ Rays || 1–6 || Ramírez (1–1) || Whitley (1–2) || Andriese (2) || 11,977 || 21–15
|- align="center" bgcolor="ffbbbb"
| 37 || May 15 || @ Royals || 1–12 || Young (3–0) || Pineda (5–1) || – || 34,584 || 21–16
|- align="center" bgcolor="bbffbb"
| 38 || May 16 || @ Royals || 5–1 || Sabathia (2–5) || Duffy (2–3) || – || 31,871 || 22–16
|- align="center" bgcolor="ffbbbb"
| 39 || May 17 || @ Royals || 0–6 || Vólquez (3–3) || Capuano (0–1) || – || 31,251 || 22–17
|- align="center" bgcolor="ffbbbb"
| 40 || May 19 || @ Nationals || 6–8 (10) || Grace (2–0) || Miller (0–1) || – || 37,355 || 22–18
|- align="center" bgcolor="ffbbbb"
| 41 || May 20 || @ Nationals || 2–3 || Zimmermann (4–2) || Warren (2–3) || Storen (12) || 37,648 || 22–19
|- align="center" bgcolor="ffbbbb"
| 42 || May 22 || Rangers || 9–10 || Lewis (4–2) || Pineda (5–2) || Ohlendorf (1) || 40,008 || 22–20
|- align="center" bgcolor="ffbbbb"
| 43 || May 23 || Rangers || 4–15 || Martinez (4–0) || Sabathia (2–6) || – || 42,067 || 22–21
|- align="center" bgcolor="ffbbbb"
| 44 || May 24 || Rangers || 2–5 || Gallardo (4–6) || Capuano (0–2) || Tolleson (3) || 45,681 || 22–22
|- align="center" bgcolor="bbffbb"
| 45 || May 25 || Royals || 14–1 || Eovaldi (4–1) || Guthrie (4–3) || – || 36,031 || 23–22
|- align="center" bgcolor="bbffbb"
| 46 || May 26 || Royals || 5–1 || Warren (3–3) || Vargas (3–2) || – || 33,414 || 24–22
|- align="center" bgcolor="bbffbb"
| 47 || May 27 || Royals || 4–2 || Pineda (6–2) || Young (4–1) || Miller (14) || 32,734 || 25–22
|- align="center" bgcolor="ffbbbb"
| 48 || May 28 || @ Athletics || 4–5 || Scribner (1–0) || Sabathia (2–7) || Clippard (5) || 21,795 || 25–23
|- align="center" bgcolor="ffbbbb"
| 49 || May 29 || @ Athletics || 2–6 || Gray (6–2) || Capuano (0–3) || Clippard (6) || 23,540 || 25–24
|- align="center" bgcolor="bbffbb"
| 50 || May 30 || @ Athletics || 5–3 || Shreve (2–1) || Hahn (2–5) || Miller (15) || 25,223 || 26–24
|- align="center" bgcolor="ffbbbb"
| 51 || May 31 || @ Athletics || 0–3 || Chavez (2–5) || Warren (3–4) || Clippard (7) || 25,457 || 26–25
|-

|- align="center" bgcolor="bbffbb"
| 52 || June 1 || @ Mariners || 7–2 || Pineda (7–2) || Hernández (8–2) || – || 26,082 || 27–25
|- align="center" bgcolor="bbffbb"
| 53 || June 2 || @ Mariners || 5–3 (11) || Wilson (2–0) || Wilhelmsen (1–1) || Miller (16) || 27,442 || 28–25
|- align="center" bgcolor="bbffbb"
| 54 || June 3 || @ Mariners || 3–1 || Tanaka (3–1) || Walker (2–6) || Miller (17) || 32,701 || 29–25
|- align="center" bgcolor="bbffbb"
| 55 || June 5 || Angels || 8–7 || Eovaldi (5–1) || Weaver (4–5) || Betances (2) || 40,310 || 30–25
|- align="center" bgcolor="bbffbb"
| 56 || June 6 || Angels || 8–2 || Warren (4–4) || Richards (5–4) || – || 40,096 || 31–25
|- align="center" bgcolor="bbffbb"
| 57 || June 7 || Angels || 6–2 || Sabathia (3–7) || Wilson (3–5) || – || 43,178 || 32–25
|- align="center" bgcolor="bbffbb"
| 58 || June 9 || Nationals || 6–1 || Tanaka (4–1) || Scherzer (6–5) || – || 36,613 || 33–25
|- align="center" bgcolor="ffbbbb"
| 59 || June 10 || Nationals || 4–5 (11) || Treinen (2–2) || Capuano (0–4) || Storen (19) || 39,847 || 33–26
|- align="center" bgcolor="ffbbbb"
| 60 || June 12 || @ Orioles || 3–11 || Jiménez (4–3) || Pineda (7–3) || – || 33,203 || 33–27
|- align="center" bgcolor="ffbbbb"
| 61 || June 13 || @ Orioles || 4–9 || Roe (2–0) || Martin (0–2) || – || 38,909 || 33–28
|- align="center" bgcolor="bbffbb"
| 62 || June 14 || @ Orioles || 5–3 || Shreve (3–1) || Wright (2–2) || Betances (3) || 36,343 || 34–28
|- align="center" bgcolor="ffbbbb"
| 63 || June 15 || @ Marlins || 1–2 || Koehler (5–4) || Tanaka (4–2) || Ramos (9) || 33,961 ||  34–29
|- align="center" bgcolor="ffbbbb"
| 64 || June 16 || @ Marlins || 2–12 || Phelps (4–3) || Eovaldi (5–2) || – || 33,083 || 34–30
|- align="center" bgcolor="bbffbb"
| 65 || June 17 || Marlins || 2–1 || Pineda (8–3) || Ureña (1–3) || Betances (4) || 43,048 || 35–30
|- align="center" bgcolor="bbffbb"
| 66 || June 18 || Marlins || 9–4 || Shreve (4–1) || Dunn (1–4) || – || 38,239 || 36–30
|- align="center" bgcolor="bbffbb"
| 67 || June 19 || Tigers || 7–2 || Warren (5–4) || Verlander (0–1) || – || 44,588 || 37–30
|- align="center" bgcolor="bbffbb"
| 68 || June 20 || Tigers || 14–3 || Eovaldi (6–2) || Simón (7–4) || Mitchell (1) || 48,092 || 38–30
|- align="center" bgcolor="ffbbbb"
| 69 || June 21 || Tigers || 4–12 || Sánchez (6–7) || Tanaka (4–3) || – || 38,691 || 38–31
|- align="center" bgcolor="ffbbbb"
| 70 || June 22 || Phillies || 8–11 || Diekman (2–1) || Pineda (8–4) || – || 36,883 || 38–32
|- align="center" bgcolor="ffbbbb"
| 71 || June 23 || Phillies || 6–11 || Giles (3–1) || Betances (4–1) || – || 36,198 || 38–33
|- align="center" bgcolor="bbffbb"
| 72 || June 24 || Phillies || 10–2 || Nova (1–0) || Hamels (5–6) || – || 45,877 || 39–33
|- align="center" bgcolor="ffbbbb"
| 73 || June 25 || @ Astros || 0–4 || Keuchel (9–3) || Warren (5–5) || – || 28,643 || 39–34
|- align="center" bgcolor="bbffbb"
| 74 || June 26 || @ Astros || 3–2 || Eovaldi (7–2) || Harris (4–1) || Betances (5) || 37,748 || 40–34
|- align="center" bgcolor="bbffbb"
| 75 || June 27 || @ Astros || 9–6 || Shreve (5–1) || Neshek (3–1) || Betances (6) || 41,133 || 41–34
|- align="center" bgcolor="ffbbbb"
| 76 || June 28 || @ Astros || 1–3 || McHugh (9–3) || Pineda (8–5) || Gregerson (18) || 31,961 || 41–35
|- align="center" bgcolor="ffbbbb"
| 77 || June 29 || @ Angels || 1–4 || Wilson (6–6) || Sabathia (3–8) || Street (22) || 42,056 || 41–36
|- align="center" bgcolor="ffbbbb"
| 78 || June 30 || @ Angels || 1–2 || Heaney (1–0) || Nova (1–1) || Street (23) || 42,036 || 41–37
|-

|- align="center" bgcolor="bbffbb"
| 79 || July 1 || @ Angels || 3–1 || Eovaldi (8–2) || Shoemaker (4–7) || Betances (7) || 40,938 || 42–37
|- align="center" bgcolor="bbffbb"
| 80 || July 3 || Rays || 7–5 (12) || Shreve (6–1) || Geltz (1–4) || – || 43,141 || 43–37
|- align="center" bgcolor="bbffbb"
| 81 || July 4 || Rays || 3–2  || Betances (5–1) || Boxberger (4–4) || – || 35,508 || 44–37
|- align="center" bgcolor="ffbbbb"
| 82 || July 5 || Rays || 1–8 || Ramírez (7–3) || Nova (1–2) || – || 35,050 || 44–38
|- align="center" bgcolor="ffbbbb"
| 83 || July 7 || Athletics || 3–4 (10) || Pomeranz (3–3) || Betances (5–2) || Clippard (16) || 32,337 || 44–39
|- align="center" bgcolor="bbffbb"
| 84 || July 8 || Athletics || 5–4 || Sabathia (4–8) || Scribner (2–2) || Miller (18) || 41,626 || 45–39
|- align="center" bgcolor="bbffbb"
| 85 || July 9 || Athletics || 6–2 || Tanaka (5–3) || Chavez (4–9) || – || 40,084 || 46–39
|- align="center" bgcolor="bbffbb"
| 86 || July 10 || @ Red Sox || 5–1 || Pineda (9–5) || Buchholz (7–7) || – || 37,984 || 47–39
|- align="center" bgcolor="ffbbbb"
| 87 || July 11 || @ Red Sox || 3–5 || Rodríguez (5–2) || Nova (1–3) || Uehara (22) || 38,047 || 47–40
|- align="center" bgcolor="bbffbb"
| 88 || July 12 || @ Red Sox || 8–6 || Eovaldi (9–2) || Miley (8–8) || – || 37,283 || 48–40
|- bgcolor=#bbcaff
| – || July 14 || 86th All-Star Game || colspan=7 | National League vs. American League (Great American Ball Park, Cincinnati) AL defeats NL, 6–3
|- align="center" bgcolor="bbffbb"
| 89 || July 17 || Mariners || 4–3 || Tanaka (6–3) || Beimel (0–1) || Miller (19) || 47,086 || 49–40
|- align="center" bgcolor="ffbbbb"
| 90 || July 18 || Mariners || 3–4 || Iwakuma (2–1) || Pineda (9–6) || Smith (7) || 46,119 || 49–41
|- align="center" bgcolor="bbffbb"
| 91 || July 19 || Mariners || 2–1 || Betances (6–2) || Rodney (2–4) || Miller (20) || 42,926 || 50–41
|- align="center" bgcolor="bbffbb"
| 92 || July 21 || Orioles || 3–2 || Wilson (3–0) || Chen (4–6) || Miller (21) || 37,993  || 51–41
|- align="center" bgcolor="bbffbb"
| 93 || July 22 || Orioles || 4–3 || Nova (2–3) || Gausman (1–2) || Miller (22) || 43,887 || 52–41
|- align="center" bgcolor="bbffbb"
| 94 || July 23 || Orioles || 9–3 || Tanaka (7–3) || Jiménez (7–6) || – || 46,875 || 53–41
|- align="center" bgcolor="ffbbbb"
| 95 || July 24 || @ Twins || 1–10 || Hughes (9–6) || Pineda (9–7)  || – || 34,334 || 53–42
|- align="center" bgcolor="bbffbb"
| 96 || July 25 || @ Twins || 8–5 || Warren (6–5) || Perkins (0–2) || Miller (23) || 40,660 || 54–42
|- align="center" bgcolor="bbffbb"
| 97 || July 26 || @ Twins || 7–2 || Eovaldi (10–2) || Gibson (8–8) || – || 37,391 || 55–42
|- align="center" bgcolor="bbffbb"
| 98 || July 27 || @ Rangers || 6–2 || Nova (3–3) || Harrison (1–2) || – || 33,691 || 56–42
|- align="center" bgcolor="bbffbb"
| 99 || July 28 || @ Rangers || 21–5 || Moreno (1–0) || Pérez (0–2) || Warren (1) || 28,403 || 57–42
|- align="center" bgcolor="ffbbbb"
| 100 || July 29 || @ Rangers || 2–5 || Lewis (11–4) || Tanaka (7–4) || Tolleson (18) || 31,658 || 57–43
|- align="center" bgcolor="ffbbbb"
| 101 || July 30 || @ Rangers || 6–7 || Tolleson (3–2) || Miller (0–2) || – || 34,407 || 57–44
|- align="center" bgcolor="bbffbb"
| 102 || July 31 || @ White Sox || 13–6 || Eovaldi (11–2) || Rodon (4–4) || – || 30,359 || 58–44
|-

|- align="center" bgcolor="ffbbbb"
| 103 || August 1 || @ White Sox || 2–8 || Danks (6–8) || Mitchell (0–1) || – || 34,379 || 58–45
|- align="center" bgcolor="bbffbb"
| 104 || August 2 || @ White Sox || 12–3 || Nova (4–3) || Samardzija (8–6) || – || 38,840 || 59–45
|- align="center" bgcolor="bbffbb"
| 105 || August 4 || Red Sox || 13–3 || Tanaka (8–4) || Owens (0–1) || – || 48,522 || 60–45
|- align="center" bgcolor="ffbbbb"
| 106 || August 5 || Red Sox || 1–2 || Wright (5–4) || Severino (0–1) || Uehara (24) || 47,489 || 60–46
|- align="center" bgcolor="bbffbb"
| 107 || August 6 || Red Sox || 2–1 || Wilson (4–0) || Rodríguez (6–4) || Miller (24) || 48,608 || 61–46
|- align="center" bgcolor="ffbbbb"
| 108 || August 7 || Blue Jays || 1–2 (10) || Cecil (3–4) || Pinder (0–1) || Osuna (9) || 42,839 || 61–47
|- align="center" bgcolor="ffbbbb"
| 109 || August 8 || Blue Jays || 0–6 || Price (11–4) || Nova (4–4) || – || 45,255 || 61–48
|- align="center" bgcolor="ffbbbb"
| 110 || August 9 || Blue Jays || 0–2 || Estrada (10–6) || Tanaka (8–5) || Osuna (10) || 42,034 || 61–49
|- align="center" bgcolor="ffbbbb"
| 111 || August 11 || @ Indians || 4–5 (16) || Adams (2–0) || Pinder (0–2) || – || 23,618 || 61–50
|- align="center" bgcolor="ffbbbb"
| 112 || August 12 || @ Indians || 1–2 || Salazar (10–6) || Sabathia (4–9) || Allen (23) || 18,844 || 61–51
|- align="center" bgcolor="bbffbb"
| 113 || August 13 || @ Indians || 8–6 || Eovaldi (12–2) || Bauer (9–9) || Miller (25) || 23,076 || 62–51
|- align="center" bgcolor="bbffbb"
| 114 || August 14 || @ Blue Jays || 4–3 || Nova (5–4) || Sanchez (6–5) || Miller (26) || 46,689 || 63–51
|- align="center" bgcolor="bbffbb"
| 115 || August 15 || @ Blue Jays || 4–1 || Tanaka (9–5) || Estrada (10–7) || – || 46,630 || 64–51
|- align="center" bgcolor="ffbbbb"
| 116 || August 16 || @ Blue Jays || 1–3 || Hutchison (12–2) || Severino (0–2) || Osuna (13) || 46,792 || 64–52
|- align="center" bgcolor="bbffbb"
| 117 || August 17 || Twins || 8–7 (10) || Miller (1–2) || Perkins (1–4) || – || 38,943 || 65–52
|- align="center" bgcolor="bbffbb"
| 118 || August 18 || Twins || 8–4 || Rumbelow (1–0) || Graham (0–1) || Miller (27) || 38,007 || 66–52
|- align="center" bgcolor="bbffbb"
| 119 || August 19 || Twins || 4–3 || Eovaldi (13–2) || Santana (2–4) || Betances (8) || 38,086 || 67–52
|- align="center" bgcolor="ffbbbb"
| 120 || August 20 || Indians || 2–3 || Tomlin (1–1) || Nova (5–5) || Allen (24) || 36,129 || 67–53
|- align="center" bgcolor="ffbbbb"
| 121 || August 21 || Indians || 3–7 || Carrasco (12–9) || Tanaka (9–6) || Allen (25) || 35,940 || 67–54
|- align="center" bgcolor="bbffbb"
| 122 || August 22 || Indians || 6–2 || Severino (1–2) || Salazar (11–7) || – || 47,031 || 68–54
|- align="center" bgcolor="ffbbbb"
| 123 || August 23 || Indians || 3–4 || Shaw (2–2) || Betances (6–3) || Allen (26) || 46,945 || 68–55
|- align="center" bgcolor="bbffbb"
| 124 || August 24 || Astros || 1–0 || Miller (2–2) || Pérez (2–2) || – || 37,125 || 69–55
|- align="center" bgcolor="ffbbbb"
| 125 || August 25 || Astros || 1–15 || Keuchel (15–6) || Nova (5–6) || – || 38,015 || 69–56
|- align="center" bgcolor="ffbbbb"
| 126 || August 26 || Astros || 2–6 || McHugh (14–7) || Pineda (9–8) || – || 37,259 || 69–57
|- align="center" bgcolor="bbffbb"
| 127 || August 28 || @ Braves || 15–3 || Tanaka (10–6) || Pérez (4–5) || – || 35,546 || 70–57
|- align="center" bgcolor="bbffbb"
| 128 || August 29 || @ Braves || 3–1 || Severino (2–2) || Wisler (5–5) || Miller (28) || 49,243 || 71–57
|- align="center" bgcolor="bbffbb"
| 129 || August 30 || @ Braves || 20–6 || Eovaldi (14–2) || Teherán (9–7) || – || 33,093 || 72–57
|- align="center" bgcolor="ffbbbb"
| 130 || August 31 || @ Red Sox || 3–4 || Rodríguez (8–5) || Nova (5–7) || Machi (4) || 36,148 || 72–58
|-

|- align="center" bgcolor="bbffbb"
| 131 || September 1 || @ Red Sox || 3–1 || Pineda (10–8) || Porcello (6–12) || Miller (29) || 35,077 || 73–58
|- align="center" bgcolor="bbffbb"
| 132 || September 2 || @ Red Sox || 13–8 || Tanaka (11–6) || Owens (2–2) || || 34,416 || 74–58
|- align="center" bgcolor="bbffbb"
| 133 || September 4 || Rays || 5–2 || Severino (3–2) || Odorizzi (6–8) || Miller (30) || 32,530 || 75–58
|- align="center" bgcolor="ffbbbb"
| 134 || September 5 || Rays || 2–3 || Cedeño (4–1) || Eovaldi (14–3) || Boxberger (34) || 35,030 || 75–59
|- align="center" bgcolor="bbffbb"
| 135 || September 6 || Rays || 6–4 || Nova (6–7) || Archer (12–11) || Miller (31) || 35,299 || 76–59
|- align="center" bgcolor="bbffbb"
| 136 || September 7 || Orioles || 8–6 || Wilson (5–0) || Rondón (0–1) || Miller (32) || 31,039 || 77–59
|- align="center" bgcolor="ffbbbb"
| 137 || September 8 || Orioles || 1–2 || O'Day (6–2) || Shreve (6–2) || Britton (31) || 30,785 || 77–60
|- align="center" bgcolor="ffbbbb"
| 138 || September 9 || Orioles || 3–5 || Jiménez (11–9) || Warren (6–6) || Britton (32) || 30,038 || 77–61
|- align="center" bgcolor="bbbbbb"
| － || September 10 || Blue Jays ||colspan="7" | Postponed (rain). Makeup date: September 12.
|- align="center" bgcolor="ffbbbb"
| 139 || September 11 || Blue Jays || 5–11 || Price (15–5) || Severino (3–3) || – || 40,220 || 77–62
|- align="center" bgcolor="ffbbbb"
| 140 || September 12 || Blue Jays || 5–9 (11) || Hendriks (5–0) || Mitchell (0–2) || Tepera (1) ||  || 77–63
|- align="center" bgcolor="ffbbbb"
| 141 || September 12 || Blue Jays || 7–10 || Stroman (1–0) || Nova (6–8) || Lowe (1) || 46,278 || 77–64
|- align="center" bgcolor="bbffbb"
| 142 || September 13 || Blue Jays || 5–0 || Tanaka (12–6) || Dickey (10–11) || – || 39,127 || 78–64
|- align="center" bgcolor="bbffbb"
| 143 || September 14 || @ Rays || 4–1 || Cotham (1–0) || Boxberger (4–10) || Miller (33) || 11,940 || 79–64
|- align="center" bgcolor="ffbbbb"
| 144 || September 15 || @ Rays || 3–6 || Odorizzi (8–8) || Rumbelow (1–1) || Gomes (1) || 13,539 || 79–65
|- align="center" bgcolor="bbffbb"
| 145 || September 16 || @ Rays || 3–1 || Severino (4–3) || Archer (12–12) || Miller (34) || 13,299 || 80–65
|- align="center" bgcolor="ffbbbb"
| 146 || September 18 || @ Mets || 1–5 || Matz (4–0) || Tanaka (12–7) || – || 43,602 || 80–66
|- align="center" bgcolor="bbffbb"
| 147 || September 19 || @ Mets || 5–0 || Pineda (11–8) || Syndergaard (8–7) || – || 43,630 || 81–66
|- align="center" bgcolor="bbffbb"
| 148 || September 20 || @ Mets || 11–2 || Sabathia (5–9) || Robles (4–3) || – || 43,571 || 82–66
|- align="center" bgcolor="ffbbbb"
| 149 || September 21 || @ Blue Jays || 2–4 || Price (17–5) || Warren (6–7) || Osuna (17) || 47,648 || 82–67
|- align="center" bgcolor="bbffbb"
| 150 || September 22 || @ Blue Jays || 6–4 (10) || Miller (3–2) || Lowe (1–3) || – || 47,992 || 83–67
|- align="center" bgcolor="ffbbbb"
| 151 || September 23 || @ Blue Jays || 0–4 || Stroman (3–0) || Nova (6–9) || – || 48,056 || 83–68
|- align="center" bgcolor="bbffbb"
| 152 || September 24 || White Sox || 3–2 || Pineda (12–8) || Sale (12–11) || Miller (35) || 35,132 || 84–68
|- align="center" bgcolor="ffbbbb"
| 153 || September 25 || White Sox || 2–5 || Rodon (9–6) || Sabathia (5–10) || Robertson (32) || 37,316 || 84–69
|- align="center" bgcolor="bbffbb"
| 154 || September 26 || White Sox || 2–1 || Warren (7–7) || Danks (7–14) || Miller (36) || 39,134 || 85–69
|- align="center" bgcolor="bbffbb"
| 155 || September 27 || White Sox || 6–1 || Severino (5–3) || Johnson (3–1) || – || 38,690 || 86–69
|- align="center" bgcolor="ffbbbb"
| 156 || September 28 || Red Sox || 1–5 || Rodríguez (10–6) || Nova (6–10) || – || 39,476 || 86–70
|- align="center" bgcolor="ffbbbb"
| 157 || September 29 || Red Sox || 4–10 || Porcello (9–14) || Pineda (12–9) || – || 38,512 || 86–71
|- align="center" bgcolor="ffbbbb"
| 158 || September 30 || Red Sox || 5–9 (11) || Ogando (3–1) || Bailey (0–1) || – || 39,328 || 86–72
|-

|- align="center" bgcolor="bbffbb"
| 159 || October 1 || Red Sox || 4–1 || Sabathia (6–10) || Hill (2–1) || Betances (9) || 40,033 || 87–72
|- align="center" bgcolor="bbbbbb"
| － || October 2 || @ Orioles ||colspan="7" | Postponed (rain). Makeup date October 3 as part of doubleheader.
|- align="center" bgcolor="ffbbbb"
| 160 || October 3 || @ Orioles || 2–9 || Chen (11–8) || Nova (6–11) || – || 29,227 || 87–73
|- align="center" bgcolor="ffbbbb"
| 161 || October 3 || @ Orioles || 3–4 || McFarland (2–2) || Betances (6–4) || Britton (36) || 35,198 || 87–74
|- align="center" bgcolor="ffbbbb"
| 162 || October 4 || @ Orioles || 4–9 || Tillman (11–11) || Pineda (12–10) || – || 33,224 || 87–75
|-

Postseason

Game log

|- align="center" bgcolor="ffbbbb"
| 1 || October 6 || Astros || 0–3 || Keuchel (1–0)  || Tanaka (0–1)  || Gregerson (1)  || 50,113 || 0–1
|-

Postseason rosters

| style="text-align:left" |
Pitchers: 19 Masahiro Tanaka 40 Luis Severino 41 Justin Wilson 43 Adam Warren 47 Iván Nova 48 Andrew Miller 55 Bryan Mitchell 67 James Pazos 68 Dellin Betances
Catchers: 34 Brian McCann 66 John Ryan Murphy 73 Gary Sánchez
Infielders: 12 Chase Headley 17 Brendan Ryan 18 Didi Gregorius 29 Dustin Ackley 31 Greg Bird 64 Rob Refsnyder
Outfielders: 11 Brett Gardner 22 Jacoby Ellsbury 24 Chris Young 36 Carlos Beltrán 55 Slade Heathcott 70 Rico Noel
Designated hitters: 13 Alex Rodriguez 
|- valign="top"

Statistics

Batting
Note: G = Games played; AB = At bats; R = Runs scored; H = Hits; 2B = Doubles; 3B = Triples; HR = Home runs; RBI = Runs batted in; BB = Base on balls; SO = Strikeouts; AVG = Batting average; SB = Stolen bases

Pitching
Note: W = Wins; L = Losses; ERA = Earned run average; G = Games pitched; GS = Games started; SV = Saves; IP = Innings pitched; H = Hits allowed; R = Runs allowed; ER = Earned runs allowed; HR = Home runs allowed; BB = Walks allowed; K = Strikeouts

Awards
 Mariano Rivera AL Reliever of the Year: Andrew Miller
 Thurman Munson Award as New York Yankees Premier Closer: Andrew Miller

Farm system

References

External links
2015 New York Yankees at Baseball Reference
2015 New York Yankees season

New York Yankees seasons
New York Yankees
New York Yankees
2010s in the Bronx